Pedro Aguirre Cerda is a commune of Chile located in Santiago Province, Santiago Metropolitan Region. It is named after President Pedro Aguirre Cerda.

Demographics
The population fell by 12.2% (15881 persons) between the 1992 and 2002 censuses.

Stats
Average annual household income: US$28,199 (PPP, 2006)
Population below poverty line: 6.3% (2006)
Regional quality of life index: 81.08, high, 9 out of 52 (2005)
Human Development Index: 0.708, 114 out of 341 (2003)

Administration
As a commune, Pedro Aguirre Cerda is a third-level administrative division of Chile administered by a municipal council, headed by an alcalde who is directly elected every four years. The 2012-1016 major is Claudina Núñez Jiménez (PC). The communal council has the following members:
 Gloria Rodríguez Calderón (PC)
 Juan Rozas Romero (IND)
 Eduardo Pastene Azola (UDI)
 Elizabeth Jiménez Oliva (IND)
 Carmen Salinas Jara (PPD)
 Eduardo Cancino Cáceres (PC)
 Rodrigo Lagos Fuentes (PDC)
 Manuel Aguilar Gálvez (RN)

Within the electoral divisions of Chile, Pedro Aguirre Cerda is represented in the Chamber of Deputies by Pedro Browne (RN) and Guillermo Teillier (PC) as part of the 28th electoral district, (together with San Miguel and Lo Espejo). The commune is represented in the Senate by Carlos Montes (PS) and Manuel José Ossandón (RN) as part of the 8th senatorial constituency (Santiago-East).

References

External links
  Municipality of Pedro Aguirre Cerda

Populated places in Santiago Province, Chile
Geography of Santiago, Chile
Communes of Chile